Supare-Akoko, is a town in Akoko South West Local Government Area in Ondo State in southwestern Nigeria. Supare is about 100 km from Akure, the state capital. It has predominantly rain forest with heavy presence of high undulating rocky and mountainous formations.
The primary occupation is artisanal and commercial agriculture. CRUSH Rock Industries (Nigeria) Limited has facilities there.

Notable people
Ali Olanusi
Sola Alabi
Micheal Oladimeji Faborode
Ojo Balogun MD/CEO Ladobal Nigeria
Festus Bankole
Revd. Eniaiyewu Raymond.                     
Gen.JO Olorunfemi.Rtd

References

Populated places in Ondo State
Articles containing video clips